Ichthyobacterium seriolicida is a species of bacteria that was isolated from a diseased yellowtail fish (Seriola quinqueradiata).

References

Flavobacteria
Bacteria described in 2016